Clive Robertson (born 28 December 1945) is an Australian radio and television personality in Sydney who has been heard on both the AM and FM bands for over forty years.

Early life 
Robertson was born in Katoomba, New South Wales, in 1945. He left school at the age of 16 to begin work on a farm (including his beloved "Massey-Harris tractor"), going on to work for his father (a lawyer), later doing court work, and then moving on to become an electrical apprentice as well as running wires for the Postmaster-General's Department. He later worked on the railways cleaning steam locomotives, and also driving them from time to time, which would fuel a lifelong fascination with them.

Career 
In 1967 with the advent of talk radio, Robertson began his broadcasting career working at a number of stations in the southwest of Western Australia. In 1972 he joined the Australian Broadcasting Corporation (ABC) in Sydney, beginning on the radio station 2BL. He moved to Canberra a few months later and worked on 2CY and 2CN. A well known part of his breakfast show on 2BL was his daily tête-à-tête with either Caroline Jones or Margaret Throsby. He also presented the 7 pm television news for the ABC.

In 1980, he worked at 2DAY-FM, but returned to the ABC some months later.

From 1982 to 1988 he was host of the Beauty and the Beast television talk show on Network Ten. Leaving ABC radio, he then moved to the Seven Network where he hosted the news program 11AM, and in 1985 became the host of Newsworld. Robertson took a unique approach to Newsworld, and his later news show on the Nine Network, Robbo's World Tonight:

Over the years Robertson has also presented radio programs on 6VA, 6TZ, 6IX, 2UE, 2GB, 2SM and ABC Classic FM, as well as TV station STW-9 and Network Ten. In 2006 he returned to national TV screens on the ABC Television show Agony Aunts.

Robertson filled in for Stan Zemanek on 2UE from 8 pm to midnight just prior to Christmas in 2006. After the new year, he was moved to the midnight to dawn overnight timeslot. Robertson left 2UE in March 2008, not able to cope with the hours, but returned to 3 pm to 6 pm on weekend afternoons, and later the 2UE Nights program (8:00 pm to 12:00 am).

On-air personality 
Robertson is known for his wry wit and humorous dealings with talk-back callers, and his outspoken manner. He said that Perth radio station 6IX fired him because he would not use the station's slogan, "Have a happy day".

Personal life 

Robertson has been married twice. His second marriage was to actress Penny Cook. Both marriages ended in divorce.

References

External links

1945 births
Classical music radio presenters
Australian talk radio hosts
Australian television personalities
Living people
People from Sydney
People from Katoomba, New South Wales
ABC radio (Australia) journalists and presenters
Former 2GB presenters